Vilma von Webenau, (born 15 February 1875 in Constantinople; died 9 October 1953 in Vienna), composer, first student of Arnold Schönberg, granddaughter of Julie von Webenau, daughter of Arthur Weber Edler von Webenau, k. & k. counsellor in Constantinople.

References
 Journal of the Arnold Schoenberg Institute, University of Southern California, 1976

External links
 Audio sample
 Arnold Schönberg Center

Austrian women composers
Austrian composers
German women composers
German composers
1875 births
1953 deaths
Edlers of Austria
Expatriates from the Austro-Hungarian Empire in the Ottoman Empire